Ilya Iosifovich Moiseev (15 March 1929 – 11 October 2020) was a Russian chemist. An expert in both kinetics and the coordination chemistry of transition metals, he made significant advances in metal-complex catalysis.

Biography
Moiseev was born in Moscow. He studied organic chemistry at Moscow State University of Fine Chemical Technologies (MITHT). After graduating in 1952, his first jobs were as an engineer, a junior researcher in physical chemistry, then a senior researcher in organic chemistry. From 1963, he worked at the N. S. Kurnakov  (IGIC) of the Russian Academy of Sciences (RAS), Moscow, as head of the laboratory of metal-complex catalysis and coordination chemistry. From 2003 onward, he was a professor at the Gubkin Russian State University of Oil and Gas (RGUNG Gubkin).

He also served as chairman of the Scientific Council for Gas Chemistry, RAS, and vice-president of the Russian Chemical Society.

Research
By developing new principles for the design of catalytic systems he created highly efficient catalysts that enabled compounds of commercial importance to be synthesized from cheap hydrocarbons. His concerns for efficiency and choice of raw materials were informed by environmental as well as economic considerations. His innovations became the basis of industrial methods for the production of acetaldehyde from ethylene, the synthesis of formic acid from carbon monoxide and water, the hydrogenation of oxygen to hydrogen peroxide, and the synthesis of isoprene. He discovered Palladium catalysts that have selective effects under mild conditions, and synthesized new classes of inorganic compounds. 

Possibly his most famous discovery was the Pd(II)-catalyzed acetoxlyation of ethylene to vinyl acetate in 1960, which has become known as Moiseev's reaction. The reaction proceeds only in the presence of sodium acetate; Moiseev used benzoquinone to regenerate the Pd(II) catalyst.

 
CH2=CH2  +  2 CH3COONa  +  PdCl2   ⟶   
CH2=CHOOCCH3  +  2 NaCl  +  Pd  +   CH3COOH

Honours and awards
In 2002 he received the State Prize of the Russian Federation in the field of science and technology. In 2011 he was awarded the Prize of the Government of the Russian Federation in the field of science and technology. He also received the orders of the Red Banner of Labor (1986), Honor (1999) and Friendship (2009).

The Royal Society of Chemistry awarded Moiseev the Centenary Prize for 2006/7. In 2012, he was awarded the Demidov Prize for his contribution to the chemistry of organoelement compounds, petrochemistry, and carbene chemistry, and the RAS Chugaev Prize for his work on coordination compounds in industrially important redox reactions. In 2013 he received the RAS Mendeleev Medal for outstanding work in the field of catalysis and energy-saving technologies.

He became a corresponding member of the Academy of Sciences of the USSR in 1990, and an academician of the Russian Academy of Sciences in 1992. He was a full member of the Academy of Sciences, Arts and Literature in Paris, the European Academy of Sciences and Arts, and the Academia Europaea.

Bibliography

References

1929 births
2020 deaths
20th-century Russian scientists
20th-century chemists
Russian chemists
Soviet chemists
Physical chemists
Demidov Prize laureates
Date of death unknown